Domitille Collardey (born 1981) is a French cartoonist and comic book designer. She is best known for her founding the Chicou-Chicou comics collective with Aude Picault.
She lives in Paris and Brooklyn, NY.

She is a former member of the cartoonist studio, Pizza Island, where she worked alongside cartoonists including Kate Beaton, Lisa Hanawalt, and Meredith Gran.

Education
Domitille graduated from les Arts Decoratifs de Paris in 2004.

Comics
Domitille founded and participated in the project Chicou-Chicou with Aude Picault, Lisa Mandel, Boulet and Erwann Surcouf for three years. A 485-page compilation of the artists' work was published by French publisher Delcourt in November 2008, in the Lewis Trondheim imprint Shampooing. Lewis Trondheim, Ruppert et Mulot and Émile Bravo have made guest appearances in the project Chicou-Chicou.

Domitille collaborated with journalist Jacques Braunstein on "Famille recompose toi" in 2008. Hachette Litératures

She is currently working on the adaptation of Jean Teulé's novel "The Suicide Shop" for French publisher Delcourt, with Olivier Ka.

She works for various press publications, such as Technikart, Beaux Arts Magazine, and Double.

Personal life
Collardey is married to singer-songwriter, actor, and visual artist Tunde Adebimpe, with whom she has a son.

References

External links
 Domitille Collardey's Official Site
 Project chicou-Chicou

French women artists
French cartoonists
1981 births
Living people